Real Madrid Baloncesto B (English: Real Madrid Basketball B) is the reserve team of Real Madrid. The team currently plays in the amateur level 4th tier level league of Spain, the Liga EBA.

History
The reserve team of Real Madrid was founded in 1955, as CB Fiesta Alegre, but it had played games since 1931. Fiesta Alegre was also known later as, Club Hesperia. With this name it played during three seasons, in the Liga Nacional, the top-tier level Spanish league, and in a final of the Copa del Rey (Spanish Cup). Hesperia was the only reserve team which could play in these games. Hesperia resigned from its place in the league in 1960.

In 1998, the team was re-founded, and since then, it has continued competing, despite a break between 2003 and 2006. In 2006, it started to play in the  LEB 2 division.

Squad information

Season by season

As Club Hesperia

Since its re-foundation in 1998

Notable players

  Nicolás Richotti
  Nedžad Sinanović
  Konstantin Kostadinov
  Bojan Bogdanović
  Ondřej Starosta
  Henri Veesaar
  Nikos Pappas
  Matteo Spagnolo
  Dino Radončić
  Maciej Lampe
  Emanuel Cățe
  Mansour Kasse
  Luka Dončić
  Pablo Aguilar
  Víctor Arteaga
  Jonathan Barreiro
  Antonio Bueno
  Dani Díez
  Usman Garuba
  Eduardo Hernández-Sonseca
  Willy Hernangómez
  Iñaki de Miguel
  Nikola Mirotić
  Juan Núñez
  Santiago Yusta
  Melwin Pantzar

External links
 Real Madrid Baloncesto academy website
 Real Madrid B on FEB.es

B
Basketball teams in the Community of Madrid
1998 establishments in Spain
Liga EBA teams
Former LEB Plata teams
Basketball teams established in 1998